Deep Water is an original novel based on the U.S. television series Buffy the Vampire Slayer.

Plot summary

After an oil spill on a nearby Sunnydale beach, Willow discovers a 'selkie'; that is, a girl that can turn into a seal with her sealskin. The selkie, dubbed Ariel by the gang, cannot return to the ocean because her sealskin was damaged by the oil spill. Willow's trying to find a spell to clean it. At the same time, mermaid-like creatures called merrows have come ashore in search of food and the vampire population gets territorial and try to kill the merrows. Buffy and the gang get stuck in the middle of a turf war while trying to save Ariel.

Continuity

Supposed to be set late in Buffy season 3.

Canonical issues

Buffy novels such as this one are not usually considered by fans as canonical. Some fans consider them stories from the imaginations of authors and artists, while other fans consider them as taking place in an alternative fictional reality. However unlike fan fiction, overviews summarising their story, written early in the writing process, were 'approved' by both Fox and Joss Whedon (or his office), and the books were therefore later published as officially Buffy merchandise.

External links

Reviews
Litefoot1969.bravepages.com - Review of this book by Litefoot
Nika-summers.com - Review of this book by Nika Summers

2000 novels
Books based on Buffy the Vampire Slayer
Pocket Books books